is a Japanese footballer who plays as a forward for Nojima Stella Kanagawa Sagamihara. She formerly played for the Japan women's national football team.

Club career
Ohno was born in Zama on 23 January 1984. She played for Nippon TV Beleza from 1999 to 2010. In 12 seasons, she played 192 matches and scored 136 goals. She became top scorer 3 times (2007, 2008 and 2010) and she was selected MVP awards 3 times (2005, 2007 and 2010). She was also selected Best Eleven 8 times (2001, 2002, 2005, 2006, 2007, 2008, 2009 and 2010). The club won L.League championship 8 times and 2nd position 4 times. In 2011, she moved to INAC Kobe Leonessa and she became top scorer with teammate Nahomi Kawasumi. From 2013, she played for Olympique Lyonnais (2013), AS Elfen Sayama FC (2013), Arsenal (2014) and INAC Kobe Leonessa (2015-2017). She is currently playing for Nojima Stella Kanagawa Sagamihara from 2018.

International career
In August 2002, Ohno was selected Japan U-20 national team for 2002 U-19 World Championship. She played 4 games and scored 3 goals. On 12 January 2003, she debuted for Japan national team against United States. Her first major tournament was the 2006 Asian Cup, where Japan placed fourth. The following year she played in the 2007 World Cup, but Japan fell in the group stage. She also competed at the 2008 Summer Olympics, and the 2011 World Cup, where she scored a goal in the group stage match against Mexico as Japan won the championship. Ohno started the final against the United States. She then competed for the Japanese silver medal-winning team at the 2012 Summer Olympics. At 2015 World Cup, Japan won 2nd position. At 2016 AFC Women's Olympic Qualifying Tournament, following Japan's failure to qualify for the 2016 Summer Olympics. This tournament became her last match for Japan. She played 139 games and scored 40 goals for Japan until 2016.

Career statistics

Club

International

Scores and results list Japan's goal tally first, score column indicates score after each Ohno goal.

Honors
 National Team
 FIFA Women's World Cup
 Champion: 2011
 Asian Games
 Gold Medal: 2010
 East Asian Football Championship
 Champions: 2008, 2010

 Club
 L.League
 Champions (10): 2000, 2001, 2002, 2005, 2006, 2007, 2008, 2010, 2011, 2012
 Empress's Cup
 Champions (8): 2000, 2004, 2005, 2007, 2008, 2009, 2011, 2012
 Nadeshiko League Cup
 Champions: 2007, 2010
 Japan and South Korea Women's League Championship
 Champions: 2012
 Women's FA Cup
 Champions: 2014

 Individual
 FIFA Women's World Cup
 All-Star Team: 2011
 L.League Division 1
 Best Player: 2005, 2007, 2010
 Top scorers: 2007, 2008, 2010, 2011
 Best Eleven (9): 2001, 2002, 2005, 2006, 2007, 2008, 2009, 2010, 2011

See also

References

External links
 
 
 
 
 Japan Football Association

1984 births
Living people
People from Zama, Kanagawa
Association football people from Kanagawa Prefecture
Japanese women's footballers
Japan women's international footballers
Nadeshiko League players
Women's Super League players
Nippon TV Tokyo Verdy Beleza players
INAC Kobe Leonessa players
Olympique Lyonnais Féminin players
Chifure AS Elfen Saitama players
Arsenal W.F.C. players
Nojima Stella Kanagawa Sagamihara players
Japanese expatriate footballers
Expatriate women's footballers in France
Expatriate women's footballers in England
Japanese expatriate sportspeople in France
Japanese expatriate sportspeople in England
Asian Games medalists in football
Footballers at the 2006 Asian Games
Footballers at the 2010 Asian Games
FIFA Women's World Cup-winning players
2007 FIFA Women's World Cup players
2011 FIFA Women's World Cup players
2015 FIFA Women's World Cup players
Olympic footballers of Japan
Olympic silver medalists for Japan
Olympic medalists in football
Medalists at the 2012 Summer Olympics
Footballers at the 2008 Summer Olympics
Footballers at the 2012 Summer Olympics
FIFA Century Club
Women's association football forwards
Asian Games gold medalists for Japan
Asian Games silver medalists for Japan
Division 1 Féminine players
Medalists at the 2006 Asian Games
Medalists at the 2010 Asian Games
Nadeshiko League MVPs